John Miley (25 December 1813–13 December 1895) was an American Methodist Episcopal minister and theologian, who was one of the major Methodist theological voices of the 19th century.

Biography

Early life
Miley was born the 25 December 1813 on a farm near Hamilton, Butler County, Ohio. Miley graduated from Augusta College where he received A.B. in 1834 and an A.M. in 1837. During his college life he was influenced by three professors Joseph Tomlinson, Joseph Trimble, and Henry Bascom.

Career
In 1838, Miley entered the church's ministry through the Ohio Conference. From 1838 to 1852, he served different churches in Ohio. In 1852 he transferred to the New York East Conference. In 1866 he transferred to the New York Conference. In 1859, the Ohio Wesleyan University conferred an honorary Doctor of Divinity degree on him.

From 1852 to 1873, he served churches in New York and Connecticut. As a Methodist pastor, he had held nineteen different pastoral appointments. In 1872, he joined a commission organized by the general conference to develop a code of ecclesiastical law for the Methodist Episcopal Church.

Beginning in 1873, he served as chair of systematic theology at Drew University in Madison, NJ, after his brother-in-law, Randolph Sinks Foster, left the seat to become a bishop. Miley was one of "the Great Five" revered professors who led Drew for decades, along with Henry Anson Buttz, George Crooks, James Strong, and Samuel F. Upham.

He was the author of Systematic Theology (1892), a two-volume work which served as a key text for Methodist seminarians for nearly thirty years. He also authored The Atonement in Christ (1879), in which he demonstrated what he believed were severe Biblical and theological problems with commonly held theories on the doctrine of the atonement of Christ such as the penal substitution and the moral example.

Theology
Miley was a systematic theologian in the Wesleyan tradition. He had Arminian soteriological views. He developed a strong governmental theory of atonement based theology heavily reliant on the work of Hugo Grotius. Thus, for him, the atonement of Christ is a satisfaction for sins by substitution, but not a satisfaction by penal substitution. The atonement of Christ is universal, but the forgiveness of sins is conditional to the faith. Moreover, the substitution of Christ is in suffering, not in penalty.

Death
Miley died the 13 December 1895.

Works

Notes and references

Citations

Sources

Further reading

External links

1813 births
1895 deaths
19th-century American theologians
19th-century Methodist ministers
American Christian theologians
American Methodist clergy
Arminian ministers
Arminian theologians
Drew University faculty
Miley
People from Hamilton, Ohio
Southern Methodists
Systematic theologians
19th-century American clergy
Augusta College (Kentucky) alumni